The Sandia Mountains (Southern Tiwa: Posu gai hoo-oo, Keres: Tsepe, Navajo: Dził Nááyisí; Tewa: O:ku:p’į, Northern Tiwa: Kep’íanenemą; Towa: Kiutawe, Zuni: Chibiya Yalanne)  are a mountain range located in Bernalillo and Sandoval counties, immediately to the east of the city of Albuquerque in New Mexico in the southwestern United States. The mountains are just due south of the southern terminus of the Rocky Mountains, and are part of the Sandia–Manzano Mountains. This is largely within the Cibola National Forest and protected as the Sandia Mountain Wilderness. The highest point is Sandia Crest, .

Etymology

Sandía means watermelon in Spanish, and is popularly believed to be a reference to the reddish color of the mountains at sunset. Also, when viewed from the west, the profile of the mountains is a long ridge, with a thin zone of green conifers near the top, suggesting the "rind" of the watermelon. However, as Robert Julyan notes, "the most likely explanation is the one believed by the Sandia Indians: the Spaniards, when they encountered the Pueblo in 1540, called it Sandia, because they thought the squash gourds growing there were watermelons, and the name Sandia soon was transferred to the mountains east of the pueblo."

In Southern Tiwa, Posu gai hoo-oo means where water slides down arroyo. The author also notes that the Sandia Pueblo Indians, who are Tiwa speakers, sometimes call the mountain Bien Mur, "big mountain".

Layout and neighboring ranges
The Sandias are a small range, a part of the Basin and Range Province, but built by a different phenomenon known as rifting, consisting of a single north–south ridge, which rises to two
major summits: Sandia Crest and South Sandia Peak, . The west side of the range is steep and rugged, with a number of sheer rock walls and towers near Sandia Crest. The east side has a gentler slope.

The Sandias are part of a single larger geologic unit, the Sandia–Manzano Mountains, which consists of two other parts: the Manzanita Mountains and the Manzano Mountains (both of which lie to the south of the Sandias). The Sandia mountains are separated from the Manzano mountains by the Manzanitas. One of the notable features in the Sandia mountains is Tijeras Canyon which leads to a historically important pass; the canyon is traversed by Interstate 40, following the route of historic U.S. Route 66.

The Sandias are the highest range in the immediate vicinity, and are well-separated from the higher Sangre de Cristo Mountains. Lying to the east and northeast of the Sandias are two smaller ranges, the Ortiz Mountains and the San Pedro Mountains.

Climate

Geology
The Sandia Mountains are a fault block range, on the eastern edge of the Rio Grande Rift Valley. The Sandias were uplifted in the last ten million years as part of the formation of the Rio Grande Rift. They form the eastern boundary of the Albuquerque Basin. The core of the range consists of Sandia granite, with a U-Pb age of 1453±12 million years. There is also some metamorphic rock of age 1.60 billion years. The limestone contains marine fossils including crinoids, brachiopods, gastropods, horn corals, and bryozoans. However, most of the fossils are too small for the human eye to detect. Potassium-feldspar (K-spar) crystals embedded within the Sandia granite give the mountains their distinct pink color.

Ecology

Entirely located within the Arizona/New Mexico Mountains ecoregion, per the Bailey's Ecoregions (US Forest Service) and the EPA Ecoregions systems, the Sandia Mountains vary much in land form, climate, species. Affinities with interior chaparral occur on lower elevations of the western slopes, while the crest and upper elevations of both slopes have affinities with the Rocky Mountains to the north.

The Sandia Mountains also encompass four different named life zones from the base to the top, due to the large changes in elevation, temperature, and precipitation. The desert grassland and savanna at the western base of the mountains (near the eastern edge of the City of Albuquerque, east of about Juan Tabo Boulevard) is part of the Upper Sonoran Zone.  From  on the milder climate western slopes of the Sandia Mountains on mostly granitic bedrock, the Upper Sonoran Zone is found. A juniper savanna mixes with desert grassland in lower elevations, while slightly higher a mixed Piñon-Juniper-Oak zone expands outward and upward from arroyos, including a thin cover of grasses such as black grama (Bouteloua eriopoda), sideoats grama (Bouteloua curtipendula), and blue grama (Bouteloua gracilis). Broadleaf evergreen shrubs and dwarfed trees are common including shrub live oak (Quercus turbinella), gray oak (Quercus grisea), and hairy mountain mahogany (Cercocarpus breviflorus). Rosette succulents include beargrass (Nolina greenei), banana yucca (Yucca baccata), Navajo yucca (Yucca baileyi), and various cacti. Deciduous shrubs include threeleaf sumac (Rhus trilobata) and wafer ash (Ptelea trifoliata). Some plants of Chihuahuan Desert affinities are found in this area, including oreganillo (Aloysia wrightii), mariola (Parthenium incanum), desert marigold (Baileya spp.), and a few subspecies of the often-numerous Engelmann prickly pear (Opuntia engelmannii).

From , in the Transition Zone, Ponderosa Pine dominates, and evergreen oaks change to more cold-tolerant deciduous oaks. From , a mixture of conifers occurs in the Canadian Zone; Gambel Oak (Quercus gambelii) is at its upper natural range in this zone.

On the eastern slopes of the Sandia Mountains, the life zones respond to a cooler climate than the western slopes, plus mostly limestone bedrock. Broadleaf evergreen plants, some succulents, and those with Chihuahuan Desert affinities are mostly absent, though other characteristics correspond to the same life zones on the western slope, except at slightly lower elevations. In the east slope's portion of the Upper Sonoran and Transition zones, alligator juniper (Juniperus deppeana) occurs, absent on the western slopes.

All zone boundary elevations are approximate, depending on microclimate or aspect of the land.

Access and recreation
There are two easy ways to reach the top of the Sandias. A road (NM 536) from the east provides access to the bottom of the ski area and also to the Sandia Crest itself, where there is a gift shop, restaurant, scenic overlook, and a large electronic communication site with numerous towers and antennas.

The Sandia Crest Scenic Byway is also a popular path for motorcycle riders with its miles of winding road to the summit.

The Sandia Mountains are the most visited range in New Mexico.
Numerous hiking trails exist on both sides of the range, such as the popular La Luz Trail and Crest Trail. Much of the west side of the range is included in the Sandia Mountain Wilderness; the trails on that side are steeper, and water is very scarce. Numerous picnic and recreation sites can be found on NM 536. These sites, along with some sites on the west face of the Sandias, require a $3 daily use/parking permit as part of the National Fee Program. There are no developed campgrounds in the Sandias.

The rock walls and pinnacles on the west side of the range provide abundant rock climbing opportunities, from bouldering and top-roping to multi-day big wall climbs on the Shield, the largest rock feature on the mountain. However, the long hikes (often off-trail) required to reach many of the climbs, and the variable quality of rock (often poor), prevent the Sandias from being a major climbing destination.

Both Sandia Peak and Sandia Crest are popular launching sites for recreational hang gliding due to the sheer drop-offs to the west. Launches at the Peak occur throughout the summer.

It's possible to walk the entire spine of the Sandia Mountains, a 26-mile hike with over 4,000 feet in elevation gain.

History

The Sandias contain a location notable for prehistoric archaeology: the Sandia Cave was believed by some in the 1930s to the 1950s to have been inhabited 10000 to 12000 years ago by the "Sandia Man," a cultural classification that is no longer used.  The cave can be accessed via a 1/2 mile trail in Las Huertas Canyon, on the northeast side of the range, near Placitas, New Mexico.

Ancestral and early Pueblo peoples have lived in the Sandia Mountains area for thousands of years. Examples of previous Pueblo settlements, now unoccupied, include Tijeras Pueblo and Pa'ako Pueblo, both founded around 700 years ago.  Sandia Pueblo is a modern pueblo, abutting the Sandia Mountains on the northwest side of the range. Some of the foothills of the range are on Sandia Pueblo land; there have been disputes in the past between the Pueblo, the Forest Service, and private landowners over rights to various parts of the range. The people of Sandia Pueblo consider the mountains a sacred place.

See also
 Manzano Mountains
 List of mountains of the United States

References
Notes

Bibliography
Chronic, Halka, Roadside Geology of New Mexico, Mountain Press Publishing, 1987.
Julyan, Robert and Mary Stuever, eds., Field Guide to the Sandia Mountains, Albuquerque, NM: UNM Press, 2005.
Schein, Mick, Sandia Rock, Boulder, Colorado: Sharp End Press, 2003.
Hibben, Frank C., Association of Man with Pleistocene Mammals in the Sandia Mountains, New Mexico, American Antiquity, 2(4):pp. 260–263, 1937.
Thompson, Jessica C., Nawa Sugiyama and Gary S. Morgan, Taphonomic Analysis of the Mammalian Fauna from Sandia Cave, New Mexico, and the Sandia Man Controversy, American Antiquity, 73(2):pp. 337–360, 2008.

External links

Sandia Ranger District
Sandia Peak Ski Area
Sandia Crest web site
TopoQuest map of the Sandias
KNME Public Media's documentary film, The Sandias
Motorcycle Classics article on riding the Sandia Crest Scenic Byway by motorcycle

Landforms of Bernalillo County, New Mexico
Mountain ranges of New Mexico
Mountains of New Mexico
Religious places of the indigenous peoples of North America
Landforms of Sandoval County, New Mexico
Hiking trails in New Mexico
Mountains of Bernalillo County, New Mexico
Mountains of Cibola County, New Mexico